The Sunward ST is a Chinese ultralight trike designed and produced by Sunward Tech (Hunan Sunward Science & Technologies Company Limited) of Zhuzhou. The aircraft is supplied complete and ready-to-fly.

Design and development

The aircraft design features a strut-braced topless hang glider-style high-wing, weight-shift controls, a two-seats-in-tandem open cockpit with a cockpit fairing, tricycle landing gear with wheel pants and a single engine in pusher configuration.

The aircraft is made from bolted-together aluminum tubing and composites. It uses a double surface Grif Hazard wing, made by the Italian company Grif Italia. The  span wing is supported by struts and uses an "A" frame weight-shift control bar. The powerplant is an Austrian-made twin cylinder, liquid-cooled, two-stroke, dual-ignition  Rotax 582 engine or four cylinder, air and liquid-cooled, four-stroke, dual-ignition  Rotax 912UL engine.

Variants
ST582
Model powered by a Rotax 582 two-stroke powerplant. Designed for flight training and aerial work, an agricultural aircraft version was introduced in 2012 with crop-spraying gear. This includes a -capacity tank that can cover .
ST912
Model powered by a Rotax 912UL four-stroke powerplant.

Specifications (ST582)

See also
Sunward STB

References

External links
Official website

ST
2010s Chinese sport aircraft
2010s Chinese ultralight aircraft
Single-engined pusher aircraft
Ultralight trikes